Coláiste Bhríde is an Irish language college in Rann na Feirste, County Donegal.

It was originally founded in 1912 in Omeath but Fr Lorcán Ó Muireadhaigh moved it to the Donegal Gaeltacht in 1926.

Among the people to have visited or attended the college are Phil Coulter, Éamon de Valera, Bernadette Devlin McAliskey, Paul Brady, Pádraig MacNamee, Tomás Ó Fiaich and T. K. Whitaker.

RTÉ Raidió na Gaeltachta aired a special programme about the college in May 2020, with the college breaking from 94 years of opening at its Donegal headquarters due to the COVID-19 pandemic.

References

External links
 Information about the college, see bottom section
 "August 31st Fielday in Ranafast", 2014 section, County Donegal Historical Society

1912 establishments in Ireland
Educational institutions established in 1912
Education in County Donegal
Gaelcholáiste
Irish-language schools and college
The Rosses